Monticello is a city in Piatt County, Illinois, United States. The population was 5,941 at the 2020 census. It is the county seat of Piatt County.

Geography 

Monticello is located in East Central Illinois between the cities of Decatur and Champaign, Illinois.

Landmarks 
Robert Allerton Park, which belongs to the University of Illinois at Urbana–Champaign and includes 1,500 acres of woodland and prairie areas, a meadow, a conference and retreat center, formal sculpture gardens, hiking trails, lodging facilities, a summer camp location, and a Georgian style mansion, is located just outside Monticello, to the southwest. The Allerton Natural Area within the park was designated a National Natural Landmark in 1970.

Monticello Railway Museum is located on the north side of Monticello. The Monticello Railway Museum is a non-profit operating railroad that offers train rides to the public from May to October.

History 

Monticello's first non-native resident was George Hayworth. Hayworth came to the area in 1822 to serve as a U.S. liaison agent to local Native American tribes. Hayworth did not remain, but in 1829, James A. Piatt purchased Hayworth's small log cabin. Soon more settlers arrived.

In 1837, residents decided to form a new town. Abraham Marquiss, William Barnes, James McReynolds, and James A. Piatt Jr. formed a joint stock company and purchased land from James A. Piatt. Upon McReynolds' suggestion, the town was christened Monticello – after the home of Thomas Jefferson. Monticello officially became a town on July 1, 1837. Townsfolk held a celebration on July 4.

The first house in the new town was built by a Mr. Cass who used the building as his home and a grocery store. The second house was a log cabin built by John Tenbrooke. In 1839, Nicholas DeVore built the "Old Fort" which was later used as a hotel. Monticello continued to grow as the population increased over the next decade.

The citizens of Monticello were unhappy with the distance required to travel to the county seat for their legal issues. Due to the petitions of George Patterson and others, a new county was established on January 27, 1841: Piatt County – named in honor the first permanent settler, James A. Piatt. As it was the only town in the area at that time, Monticello was named the county seat. The county began legal functions on April 5, 1841 in the "Old Fort." In 1843, the first courthouse was built on land donated by William H. Piatt.

Monticello's star resident arrived in 1885. Dr. William B. Caldwell came to practice medicine in Monticello but his homemade mixture of senna and pepsin brought Monticello to a level of national prominence. The Pepsin Syrup Company was founded in 1893, and became the leading employer in the city for decades until its closure in 1985. The building in which it operated has since been demolished. The site is now used as an unofficial soccer practice field.

In 1987 the 150th birthday of the town was celebrated with an open air reenactment and other festivities.

The Potawatomi Trail of Death passed through the town in 1838.

In a 2012 episode of the Comedy Central program The Daily Show, host Jon Stewart used the town in a joke segment, referring to it as Dogshit Bluffs.

Demographics 

As of the census of 2000, there were 5,138 people, 2,146 households, and 1,446 families residing in the city. The racial makeup of the city was 99.01% White, 0.08% African American, 0.14% Native American, 0.14% Asian, 0.02% Pacific Islander, 0.08% from other races, and 0.54% from two or more races. Hispanic or Latino of any race were 0.80% of the population.

There were 2,146 households, out of which 29.2% had children under the age of 18 living with them, 58.4% were married couples living together, 6.8% had a female householder with no husband present, and 32.6% were non-families. 29.7% of all households were made up of individuals, and 16.6% had someone living alone who was 65 years of age or older. The average household size was 2.34 and the average family size was 2.91.
Also home to Kirby Hospital.
In the city, the population was spread out, with 23.4% under the age of 18, 6.1% from 18 to 24, 26.4% from 25 to 44, 24.3% from 45 to 64, and 19.9% who were 65 years of age or older. The median age was 42 years. For every 100 females, there were 88.9 males. For every 100 females age 18 and over, there were 83.2 males.

The median income for a household in the city was $45,754, and the median income for a family was $57,287. Males had a median income of $41,074 versus $24,130 for females. The per capita income for the city was $23,257. About 2.3% of families and 3.8% of the population were below the poverty line, including 1.6% of those under age 18 and 7.5% of those age 65 or over.

Notable people 

 Robert Allerton, art collector and philanthropist
 Robert C. Burke, United States Marine who posthumously received Medal of Honor for heroism in Vietnam in 1968
 Harry Combes, basketball player and head coach at the University of Illinois
 Rolla C. McMillen, former U.S. Representative
 Allen F. Moore, former U.S. Representative
 James P. Ownby Illinois state representative; lived in Monticello
 Andrew Peterson, Contemporary Christian music artist
 Rolland F. Tipsword, Illinois state representative and judge

References 

Monticello, 150 years later by Swango, Lynn; LC Control No.: 87070963; . (Source for History section)

External links 

MonticelloIllinois.net
Monticello Railway Museum
Allerton Park

Cities in Piatt County, Illinois
County seats in Illinois
Populated places established in 1829
Cities in Illinois